The Montenegrin Cup 2015-16 was the first edition of the Montenegrin football tournament for women. Seven football clubs participated in the event. The winner of the competition was ŽFK Ekonomist Nikšić.

Format
The competition started October 15, 2015, and finished with the final game on May 16, 2016. There were three rounds of competition: quarterfinals, semifinals and a final match.

Results

Quarterfinals

Semifinals

Final

See also
Montenegrin Women's League
Football Association of Montenegro
Football in Montenegro

References

Cup
Women
Women's sports competitions in Montenegro
2015–16 in Montenegrin football
2015 in women's association football
2016 in women's association football